A Memory Called Empire is a 2019 science fiction novel, the debut novel by Arkady Martine. It follows Mahit Dzmare, the ambassador from Lsel Station to the Teixcalaanli Empire, as she investigates the death of her predecessor and the instabilities that underpin that society. The book won the 2020 Hugo Award for Best Novel.

Synopsis
When the Teixcalaanli Empire asks that Yskandr Aghavn, the ambassador from Lsel Station, be replaced, Lsel sends Mahit Dzmare—who, like Yskandr, is an admirer of Teixcalaanli culture. Mahit secretly has within her brain an "imago machine" with a recording of Yskandr's memories and consciousness so that he may guide her; however, shortly after their arrival on Teixcalaan, the machine malfunctions, and Yskandr no longer responds. With the aid of her cultural liaison Three Seagrass and Imperial advisor Nineteen Adze, Mahit discovers the connections between the original Yskandr's death and the looming Teixcalaanli succession crisis—and the threat of a civil war, in which Lsel Station could be a target for annexation.

Major themes
In the New York Times, Amal el-Mohtar reported that the novel explores the intersection between our past and future selves. It looks at language, grammar, and custom, things that are intertwined with the politics of conquest and the broader culture.

The Verge observed that the book discusses how institutional memory guides society and shapes politics, and provides insight into the ideas of conquest and colonialism by comparing the different worldviews of the expansion-minded Teixcalaanli Empire and the fiercely independent Lsel Stationers. Tor.com emphasised the degree to which Mahit is perceived as a "barbarian" by the Teixcalaanli.

Reception
A Memory Called Empire won the 2020 Hugo Award for Best Novel and the 2020 Compton Crook Award, and was a finalist for the Nebula Award for Best Novel of 2019.

Publishers Weekly gave the novel a starred review, calling it a "gorgeously crafted space opera", and lauding its worldbuilding and backstory. Kirkus Reviews stated that the novel was "a confident beginning" and compared it positively to the works of Ann Leckie and Yoon Ha Lee. The New York Times praised it as "a mesmerizing debut, sharp as a knife." The Verge described it as "an excellent, gripping novel with a brisk plot, outstanding characters, and plenty to think about long after it's over." Tor.com called it "a stunning debut", praising its worldbuilding, characterization, and subtlety.

Sequel 
The sequel A Desolation Called Peace was published in March 2021. Set a few months after the events of A Memory Called Empire, the action takes place in part on the Jewel of the World, but also at Lsel station and mostly in the warships on the boundary of the Teixcalaan universe. Mahit and Three Seagrass go there to negotiate with an unknown species. Like the first book, A Desolation Called Peace won the Hugo Award for Best Novel

References

External links
What’s in a Teixcalaanli Name?, on Tor.com

2010s LGBT novels
2019 science fiction novels
2019 LGBT-related literary works
2019 American novels
Debut science fiction novels
LGBT speculative fiction novels
2019 debut novels
Hugo Award for Best Novel-winning works
Tor Books books